Streptomyces paradoxus is a bacterium species from the genus of Streptomyces which has been isolated from soil from Russia. Actinosporangium violaceum was transferred to Streptomyces paradoxus.

See also 
 List of Streptomyces species

References

Further reading

External links
Type strain of Streptomyces paradoxus at BacDive -  the Bacterial Diversity Metadatabase

paradoxus
Bacteria described in 1986